Lorymodes stenopteralis is a species of snout moth in the genus Lorymodes. It was described by George Hampson in 1917. It is found in South Africa.

References

Endemic moths of South Africa
Moths described in 1917
Pyralinae